The Walker-Ewing-Glass Log House is a log house located on Pinkerton Run Road in Settler's Cabin Park, North Fayette Township, Allegheny County, Pennsylvania.  It may have been built in the 1780s by a man named John Henry. In 1785, Isaac and Gabriel Walker acquired the land, and Gabriel built the nearby Walker-Ewing Log House around the same time.  The Walker-Ewing-Glass Log House was added to the List of Pittsburgh History and Landmarks Foundation Historic Landmarks in 1970.

References

Houses in Allegheny County, Pennsylvania
Houses completed in 1790
Log buildings and structures in Pennsylvania
Log cabins in the United States
History of Allegheny County, Pennsylvania
Pittsburgh History & Landmarks Foundation Historic Landmarks